The Plough and Stars is a bar and music venue in Cambridge, Massachusetts. It was founded in 1969 by brothers Peter and Padraig O'Malley, named after the play by Seán O'Casey. The Boston Globe and Boston Phoenix have noted its disproportionate cultural influence for its size, with a number of noted musicians, writers, and politicians frequenting the bar over the years.

Ploughshares

The literary journal Ploughshares is named for the bar, where it was founded in 1971 by DeWitt Henry and former bartender/owner Peter O'Malley.

Notable patrons
The Marywallopers, popular Irish folk band
Jarrett Barrios, politician and former employee
Mickey Bones, musician
Dana Colley, musician
Lawrence Ferlinghetti, poet, activist, and  co-founder of City Lights Booksellers & Publishers
J. Geils Band members
Seamus Heaney, poet
DeWitt Henry, author and founder of Ploughshares
John Hume, politician
David Mamet, writer and director
Paul H. Patterson, scientist
Bonnie Raitt, musician
Kenneth Reeves, politician
Philip Roth, author
Mark Sandman, musician

References

External links

Drinking establishments in Massachusetts
Restaurants in Cambridge, Massachusetts
Buildings and structures in Cambridge, Massachusetts
Tourist attractions in Cambridge, Massachusetts
Music venues completed in 1969
1969 establishments in Massachusetts